The Kenilworth Public Schools is a comprehensive community public school district that serves students in pre-kindergarten through twelfth grade from the borough of Kenilworth, in Union County, New Jersey, United States.

As of the 2019–20 school year, the district, comprising two schools, had an enrollment of 1,455 students and 130.0 classroom teachers (on an FTE basis), for a student–teacher ratio of 11.19:1.

The district participates in the Interdistrict Public School Choice Program at David Brearley High School, having been approved on November 2, 1999, as one of the first ten districts statewide to participate in the program. Seats in the program for non-resident students are specified by the district and are allocated by lottery, with tuition paid for participating students by the New Jersey Department of Education. Each school year, slots are made available by grade and a lottery is used to select attendees if there are more applicants than available slots. Prospective Choice participants must be residents of Union County eligible for placement in grades 7-10 who were enrolled in a public school during the full year prior to entry to the Kenilworth Public Schools.

Students from Winfield Township attend David Brearley High School as part of a sending/receiving relationship with the Winfield Township School District.

The district is classified by the New Jersey Department of Education as being in District Factor Group "DE", the fifth-highest of eight groupings. District Factor Groups organize districts statewide to allow comparison by common socioeconomic characteristics of the local districts. From lowest socioeconomic status to highest, the categories are A, B, CD, DE, FG, GH, I and J.

Schools
Schools in the district (with 2018–19 enrollment data from the National Center for Education Statistics) are:
Elementary school
Warren G. Harding Elementary School with 690 students in grades PreK-6
Ronald Bubnowski, Principal
Middle/high school
David Brearley Middle School / David Brearley High School with 757 students in grades 7-12
Jeremy Davies, Principal

Administration
Core members of the district's administration are:
Kyle Arlington, Superintendent of Schools
Vincent A. Gonnella, Business Administrator / Board Secretary

Former superintendent Thomas Tramaglini resigned from his position effective September 2018, after he had been arrested for an incident in which he had been charged with defecating at the athletic fields at Holmdel High School. Marilyn Birnbaum was hired to serve as superintendent, acting on an interim basis until Kyle Arlington took over on a permanent basis in February 2019.

Board of education
The district's board of education, with nine members, sets policy and oversees the fiscal and educational operation of the district through its administration. As a Type II school district, the board's trustees are elected directly by voters to serve three-year terms of office on a staggered basis, with three seats up for election each year held (since 2012) as part of the November general election. The board appoints a superintendent to oversee the day-to-day operation of the district.

References

External links
Kenilworth Public Schools

Data for the Kenilworth Public Schools, National Center for Education Statistics

Kenilworth, New Jersey
New Jersey District Factor Group DE
School districts in Union County, New Jersey